The U.S. state of Michigan has been the site of several major wildfires. The worst of these were in the lumbering era of the late-1800s when lumbering practices permitted the buildup of large slash piles and altered forest growth patterns which may have contributed to size of the wildfires. The scattered nature of settlements, lumber camps and Indian tribes during this time lead to large uncertainties in determining the number of deaths and property losses. More recent fires have been much smaller and contained by modern firefighting methods with better records of the destruction they caused. Almost all of the thousands of yearly fires in the state are only a few acres, although 100-200 homes are damaged each year by these small fires.

Wildfires

See also

Gallery

References

Bibliography

 
Wildfires